Raising Sextuplets is a reality television series produced in the United States by Eric Schiff Productions about the Masche family, consisting of parents Bryan and Jenny Masche and their sextuplets. It aired on WE tv. The family originally appeared in a one-hour special titled OMG! Sextuplets! in 2008. The second season of Raising Sextuplets premiered on WE tv on June 24, 2010. In the UK, the show is known as "Ouch! Sextuplets".

Family history
Jenny and Bryan met via email while Bryan was stationed in Kuwait with the Air Force. They were married a year later on January 2, 2004. Jenny is a physician assistant and Bryan is now a pharmaceutical salesman. They also own a real estate investment company. The sextuplets are the results of artificial insemination after Jenny had two miscarriages.

The babies were delivered at thirty weeks, four days at Banner Good Samaritan Medical Center in Phoenix, Arizona. The Masche babies were the second set of sextuplets to be born at Banner Good Samaritan Medical Center. The three boys and three girls weighed between 2 lbs., 1 oz. and 3 lbs. and were delivered by Cesarean section within about six minutes beginning at 8:21 a.m.

After delivery, Jenny's heart failed and she was rushed to an intensive care unit, where she nearly died due to complications from the extreme pregnancy. She recovered enough after five days to visit her sextuplets in the NICU. The babies spent about five weeks in the hospital after birth. Prior to Raising Sextuplets, the Masches appeared on television a few times: Bryan asked Jenny to marry him on national television at an Arizona Diamondbacks baseball game in 2003, the couple appeared on the Today show during the pregnancy and afterward, and  Jenny competed on Deal or No Deal.

The family used to reside in Lake Havasu City, Arizona. They now reside in Destin, Florida.

On September 11, 2010, Bryan Masche was arrested at his father-in-law's home in Camp Verde, Arizona for resisting arrest, disorderly conduct, and threatening per domestic violence. On September 17, 2010, Jenny Masche filed for legal separation from husband Bryan in Yavapai County, Arizona. The couple were soon divorced. Jenny is remarried to Levi McClendon and they have two sons, Cash and Walker.

Family
Parents
 Bryan John Masche
 Jennifer "Jenny" Lynn Simbric Masche

Sextuplets - born  in birth order:
 Savannah Jane Masche
 Bailey Elizabeth Masche
 Grant William Masche
 Cole Robert Masche
 Molli Grace Masche
 Blake Nickolas Masche

Overview

Episode guide

Specials

Season 1

Season 2

References

2009 American television series debuts
2000s American reality television series
2010 American television series endings
2010s American reality television series
Sextuplets
Television shows set in Lake Havasu City, Arizona
Television series about children
Television series about families